Pony und Knappe is an outdoor 1896 bronze sculpture by German sculptor Erdmann Encke, installed in Tiergarten in Berlin, Germany.

External links

 

1896 establishments in Germany
1896 sculptures
Bronze sculptures in Germany
Horses in art
Mitte
Outdoor sculptures in Berlin
Statues in Germany
Tiergarten (park)